Cape Lockyer is a steep rock headland  northeast of Lambeth Bluff on the southeast side of Heard Island. It was surveyed in 1948 by Australian National Antarctic Research Expeditions and named by them for Lieutenant H.C.J. Lockyer, Royal Australian Naval Volunteer Reserve, one of the officers on HMAS Labuan, relief ship for the expedition.

References 

Headlands of Heard Island and McDonald Islands